The Bahamas are a group of about 700 islands and cays in the western Atlantic Ocean, of which only between 30 and 40 are inhabited. The Bimini islands are to its northwest. To the North is the island of Grand Bahama, home to the second-largest city in the country, Freeport. The island of Great Abaco is to its east. In the far south is the island of Great Inagua, the second-largest island in the country. Other notable islands include Eleuthera, Cat Island, San Salvador Island, Acklins, Crooked Island, and Mayaguana. Nassau is the capital and largest city, located on New Providence. The islands have a tropical savannah climate, moderated by the Gulf Stream.

The islands are surface projections of two oceanic Bahama Banks - the Little Bahama Bank and the Great Bahama Bank. The land on the Bahamas has a foundation of fossil coral, but much of the rock is oolitic limestone; the stone is derived from the disintegration of coral reefs and seashells. The land is primarily either rocky or mangrove swamp. Low scrub covers much of the surface area. Pineyards are found on four of the northern islands: Grand Bahama, Great Abaco, New Providence, and Andros. On some of the southern islands, low-growing tropical hardwood flourishes. Although some soil is very fertile, it is also very thin. Only a few freshwater lakes and just one river, located on Andros Island, are found in the Bahamas.

Climate

The climate of the Bahama islands is mostly tropical savanna, with two seasons, a hot and wet summer (wet season) and dry winter (dry season).

During the wet season, which extends from May through October, the climate is dominated by warm, moist tropical air masses as the Bermuda High brings a southeasterly flow from the deep tropics. Daily high temperatures are in the  range, with a dew point temperatures in the  range, creating the typical hot and sultry island weather. Brief but intense thundershowers are common with thunder and lightning. In the wet season, tropical storms and weak tropical lows may also contribute to the seasonal rainfall.

In the dry season, extending from November through April, the subtropical high retreats, and a mix of drier northeast trade winds and occasional westerlies coming down from the North American mainland impact the Bahamas. Sunny, arid conditions prevail in the Bahamas in the dry season, and at times drought conditions can impact farming and agriculture. High temperatures during the dry season are in the  range.

Annual rainfall averages  and is usually concentrated in the May–June and September–October periods. Rainfall often occurs in short-lived, fairly intense, but brief thundershowers accompanied by strong gusty winds, followed by a return to clear skies.

Winds are predominantly easterly throughout the year but tend to become northeasterly from October to April and southeasterly from May to September. These winds seldom exceed twenty-four kilometres per hour except during hurricane season. Although the hurricane season officially lasts from June to November, most hurricanes in the Bahamas occur between July and October.  The strongest storm to strike the country was Hurricane Andrew in 1992, until Hurricane Dorian struck in 2019. Damage was estimated at US$250 million and mainly affected agricultural products.

The most intense hurricane to strike the Bahamas was Hurricane Dorian in 2019, with wind gusts of up to  being recorded. 84 people died (74 of which were from the Bahamas), and there was catastrophic damage to buildings, homes, and boats, and sometimes complete destruction. Preliminary damage estimates are in the US$7 billion range.

Geography

Location

Atlantic Ocean, chain islands in the North Atlantic Ocean, southeast of Florida, northeast of Cuba and northwest of the Turks and Caicos Islands.

Geographic coordinates (capital city Nassau): 25°4′N 77°20′W

Area
total: 13,880 km2
county comparison to the world: 161
land: 3865 square miles;  10,010 km2
water: 3,870 km2

Area comparative
Australia comparative: 6 times larger than the Australian Capital Territory
Canada comparative: a little over twice the size of Prince Edward Island
Poland comparative: slightly smaller than Świętokrzyskie Voivodeship
United Kingdom comparative: slightly smaller than Northern Ireland
United States comparative: slightly smaller than Connecticut
France comparative: slightly larger than Île-de-France
The Philippines comparative: slightly larger than Ilocos Region
Germany comparative: slightly smaller than Schleswig-Holstein
Russia comparative: slightly smaller than Karachay-Cherkess Republic

Land

Natural resources
 salt, limestone, timber, arable land

Land use
arable land: 0.8%
permanent crops: 0.04%
other: 98.8% (2012)

Coastline
 
 A recent global remote sensing analysis suggested that there were 1,354km² of tidal flats in the Bahamas, making it the 24th ranked country in terms of tidal flat area.

Sea territory

Terrain
 The terrain consists of long, flat coral formations with some low rounded hills.

Extreme points
Northernmost point – Walker's Cay, Abaco Islands
Southernmost point – Matthew Town Great Inagua island
Westernmost point – Elbow Cays, Bimini
Easternmost point – Mayaguana Island
Lowest point – Atlantic Ocean 0 m
Highest point – Mount Alvernia: 63 m
Closest point to Cuba - Cay Lobos 21 km (13 mi)

Irrigated land
 10 km2 (2003)

Total renewable water resources
 0.02 km3 (2011)

Environment

Natural hazards
Hurricanes and other tropical storms that cause extensive flood and wind damage

Environment - Current issues
Coral reef decay
Solid waste disposal

Environment - International agreements
Party to these agreements: 
Biodiversity, Climate Change, Climate Change-Kyoto Protocol, Desertification, Endangered Species, Hazardous Wastes, Law of the Sea, Ozone Layer Protection, Ship Pollution, Wetl

Geography - note
 The Bahamas is strategically located adjacent to the United States and Cuba (Cay Confites to 14 miles).
 The Bahamas is an extensive island chain of which 30 islands are inhabited.

See also

Islands of the Bahamas

References

Further reading

 
Articles containing video clips